Gimmie Dat Beat (also titled as Gimmie Dat Beat: The Best of D.C. Go Go, Volume 2) is a remix-compilation album consisting of prominent go-go songs remixed and compiled by DJ Kool.  The album was released on April 8, 1997.

Track listing

Personnel
Adapted from AllMusic
DJ Kool – compilation producer, DJ, mixing, vocals
BackYard Band – primary artist
Chuck Brown & the Soul Searchers – primary artist
Huck-A-Bucks – primary artist
Junk Yard Band – primary artist
Michael "Funky Ned" Neal – mixing
Northeast Groovers – primary artist
Rare Essence – primary artist

References

External links
Gimmie Dat Beat at Discogs

1997 compilation albums
1997 remix albums
DJ Kool albums
Go-go albums